Ross Lindsay Birrell (17 December 1948 - 16 March 2015) was an Australian professional rugby league footballer who played for the South Sydney Rabbitohs.

Biography 
Born in 1948, Birrell started out as rugby union player and toured overseas with the Emerging Wallabies team, before making the switch to rugby league.

Birrell was a member of South Sydney's first-grade team from 1972 to 1975, playing as a centre, fullback and winger. Occasionally he served as the team's goalkicker and amassed 17-points in a win over Balmain in 1972. During his time at South Sydney he also had a stint in England with Hull Kingston Rovers.

In 1976 he left South Sydney to coach the Wagga Magpies.

Birrell died from cancer in 2015, at the age of 66. A real estate agent, he was the founder of Thornton Realty in Maitland, which he had established in 1996.

References

External links
Ross Birrell at Rugby League project

1949 births
2015 deaths
Australian rugby league players
South Sydney Rabbitohs players
Rugby league centres
Rugby league fullbacks
Rugby league wingers
Hull Kingston Rovers players